The Seventh Continent is a 1966 Yugoslav and Czechoslovakian co-production film directed by Dušan Vukotić.

Plot
A group of children discovers a new continent, not inhabited by adults. Soon, thousands of children of all races begin to abandon their parents and arrive at the new continent, forming a friendly and joyous society, where everyone is equal. Their parents realize children are going missing all over the world and begin to look for them, but are unaware of the existence of the seventh continent.

Cast
 Demeter Bitenc as White Boy's Father 
 Karla Chadimová as General's Wife 
 Vanja Drach as Diplomat 
 Oudy Rachmat Endang as Yellow Girl's Father 
 Mikloš Huba as General 
 Jindřich Láznička
 Antun Nalis as Otac djece 
 Tomislav Pasarić as White Boy 
 Hermina Pipinić as White Boy's Mother 
 Abdoulaye Seck as Black Boy 
 Viktor Starčić as Expert at Conference 
 Iris Vrus as Yellow Girl 
 Dano Živojinović

Production
The film was shot in Ulcinj, Montenegro. A number of children of foreign diplomats serving in Yugoslavia were cast in the film. Abdoulaye Seck, playing the role of the Black Boy, was the son of a Senegalese diplomat stationed in Belgrade.

Themes and reception
Croatian film critic Nenad Polimac described the film as a "benign fairytale-like fantasy with a moral". The Croatian Film Association database of Croatian cinema notes the film's criticism of the modern civilization and its mechanisms of repression, as well as its poetic visuals, but also its ultimately excessive idealization of the children's world, stereotypically contrasted with the world of grown-ups.

References

External links
 

1966 films
1960s fantasy films
1960s Croatian-language films
Films directed by Dušan Vukotić
Jadran Film films
Croatian fantasy films
Yugoslav fantasy films
Films set on islands
Films shot in Montenegro